The Hot Docs Ted Rogers Cinema (formerly the Bloor Cinema and the Bloor Hot Docs Cinema) is a movie theatre in The Annex district of downtown Toronto, Ontario, Canada, located at 506 Bloor Street West, near its intersection with Bathurst Street and the Bathurst subway station.

The venue serves as the primary home of the annual Hot Docs Canadian International Documentary Festival, as well as screening a regular theatrical lineup of documentary films throughout the year and serving as a venue for other smaller film festivals and cultural events.

History
In 1913, the Madison Picture Palace opened at this location. It was demolished in 1940 and rebuilt as the Midtown Theatre. It was renamed the Capri in 1967. In 1973, it became the Eden, showing adult films. It became the Bloor in 1979 and returned to showing first-run films. One year later, it was sold, becoming an independent repertory-style theatre. It was sold to the Blue Ice Group in 2011 and to the Hot Docs Festival in 2016.

For a large part of recent history, the Bloor Cinema was a second-run theatre, showing movies that had already been in theatres, usually before they were released on video and DVD. The theatre screened classic films, art films, and cult films. The Rocky Horror Picture Show was traditionally screened with a live cast on Halloween and on the last Friday of every month. The Bloor Cinema was repeatedly selected as the best repertory cinema in Toronto by Eye Weekly. The theatre was independent and it reopened after its renovation in 1999.

Hot Docs
Although it was closed in 2010, the Bloor Cinema's owner turned away developers looking to replace the theatre. In 2011, it was sold to the Blue Ice Group who managed the cinema in partnership with Hot Docs, where it was renovated and reopened under the moniker the Bloor Hot Docs Cinema in 2012. It is the main location for Hot Docs, akin to the Toronto International Film Festival's Bell Lightbox.

On June 23, 2016, it was announced that Hot Docs had purchased the Bloor Cinema from the Blue Ice Group, using a  gift from the Rogers Foundation, and that the cinema would be rebranded as the Hot Docs Ted Rogers Cinema.

See also
 List of cinemas in Toronto

References

External links
 
 

Cinemas and movie theatres in Toronto
Repertory cinemas
1941 establishments in Ontario
Festival venues in Canada